Scott Simonson (born April 13, 1992) is a former American football tight end. He was signed by the Oakland Raiders as an undrafted free agent in 2014. He played college football at Assumption.

Born in Staten Island, New York and raised in Red Bank, New Jersey, Simonson played prep football at Middletown High School South. As a fourth-grader, Simonson made a  blood marrow donation to help save the life of his then three-year-old sister, who had been diagnosed with Fanconi anemia.

College career
In his collegiate career, Simonson played in 36 games with 31 starts at Assumption. He totaled 104 receptions for 1,537 yards and 15 touchdowns. As a senior in 2013, he was named as a First-team All-Northeast-10 Conference selection. He started 11 games and led the team with 39 catches for 604 yards and five touchdowns. As a junior in 2012, he was a second-team All-Northeast Conference choice. He started 10 games and finished second on the team with 36 receptions for 558 yards and six touchdowns. As a sophomore in 2011, he started 10 games and caught 29 passes for 375 yards and four touchdowns. As a freshman in 2010, he played in five games.

Professional career

Oakland Raiders

On May 16, 2014, Simonson was signed as an undrafted free agent by the Oakland Raiders. On September 1, 2014, he was signed to the Raiders' practice squad. On December 6, 2014, he was promoted to the Raiders' active roster. On June 4, 2015, he was waived by the Raiders.

Carolina Panthers
On June 10, 2015, Simonson was signed by the Carolina Panthers. On September 5, 2015, he was released by the Panthers. On September 7, 2015, Simonson was signed to the Panthers' practice squad.

On February 7, 2016, Simonson's Panthers played in Super Bowl 50. In the game, the Panthers fell to the Denver Broncos by a score of 24–10.

Simonson was released on October 15, 2016. He was re-signed on October 18, 2016. He was released by the Panthers on November 4, 2016, and was re-signed to the practice squad on November 9. He signed a reserve/future contract with the Panthers on January 2, 2017.

On September 1, 2017, Simonson was placed on injured reserve.

New York Giants
On June 12, 2018, Simonson signed with the New York Giants.

On December 23, 2018, Simonson scored his first career NFL touchdown against the Indianapolis Colts in a Week 16 match-up, on a three-yard reception from quarterback Eli Manning.

On February 19, 2019, Simonson signed a one-year contract extension with the Giants. He was placed on injured reserve on August 31, 2019, with an ankle injury. He was released from injured reserve with an injury settlement on September 10. On November 12, 2019, Simonson was re-signed by the Giants. He was placed on injured reserve on December 28, 2019, with a concussion. On February 24, 2020, Simonson was released by the New York Giants.

References

External links
New York Giants bio
Oakland Raiders bio

1992 births
Living people
American football tight ends
Assumption Greyhounds football players
Oakland Raiders players
Carolina Panthers players
New York Giants players
Middletown High School South alumni
People from Red Bank, New Jersey
Players of American football from New Jersey
Sportspeople from Monmouth County, New Jersey